Mark M. Persaud, LL.B., LL.M., LL.D.  is a Canadian lawyer, entrepreneur,  civic leader, and public figure. He is a former federal prosecutor.

Childhood 
Persaud was born in British Guiana (now Guyana) in South America where he grew up and attended high school. He was active in politics as a student and eventually departed to Canada alone as a youth  as a result of civil and political unrest in his country of birth. He started life in Canada  as a homeless youth on the streets of Toronto in winter from where he was rescued by the Scott Mission, a Christian outreach organisation.

Education 

Persaud read political science at York University  and received both his law degrees ( LL.B. 1991, LL.M. 2001 )  from Osgoode Hall Law School. He also studied at the Center  for the Study of Values in Public Life at Harvard University. In June, 2016 he received an honorary Doctor of Laws LL.D. from the Law Society of Upper Canada.

He has taught as an adjunct law professor in the United States  as well as being a guest lecturer,  speaker and media commentator. He continues to be actively involved in mentoring students and young professionals.

Legal career 

Persaud worked as a federal prosecutor at the Department of Justice and as civil litigation counsel arguing judicial reviews in the Federal Court of Canada. He was also legal counsel to the Royal Canadian Mounted Police on organized crime/proceeds of crime investigations. He subsequently worked in a private law firm in Toronto where he practised in both civil, criminal and regulatory law before starting the Persaud Law Group Professional Corporation in 2011. He is a member of the Editorial Board of Canadian Lawyer and the  Chair of the Justice Committee of the Black North Initiative (BNI).

Politics 
He was twice elected to the National Executive of the Liberal Party of Canada. He served as an Advisor to a Federal Cabinet Minister. As a result of internal disagreements with senior staff to Prime Minister Paul Martin regarding the unequal treatment of minorities in the party he left the Liberal Party of Canada and publicly supported the  Conservative Party of Canada in the 2008 election. He is currently not affiliated to any political party.

Awards and recognitions 
Three years after arriving in Canada, he was nominated and short listed for the Toronto Man of the Year Award in the Toronto Star newspaper for his work with refugees. He has been the founder, director, advisor and volunteer with numerous non-profit organisations and has won many awards and recognitions for his public service. These achievements include the 2007 Alumni Public Sector Law Gold Key award from Osgoode Hall Law School, both the Queen Elizabeth II Golden and Queen Diamond Jubilee medals as well as the 2022 Queen Elizabeth II Platinum Jubilee Award for leadership and service to Canada. He also was awarded a Canada 150 Anniversary Medal in recognition of his many contributions. He received the Osgoode Hall Law School Alumni Public Sector Gold Key Award for Public Law in 2007. He was nominated by the diplomatic community for the 2006 Seoul Peace Prize and recognised by The Law Society of Ontario as an exceptional lawyer (1941–present) as part of their Lawyers Make History Project. In June 2016 the Law Society of Ontario Canada conferred upon him the degree of Doctor of Laws honoris causa (LLD) in recognition of his extraordinary accomplishments and achievements.

Human rights 
He has worked on refugee protection, racial and gender equality and homelessness. He publicly alleged racism and discrimination at the Department of Justice when he was invited to testify before the Standing Senate Committee on Human Rights. As a result of his testimony before the Senate Human Rights committee, the Department of Justice determined that over six hundred of its most senior lawyers must receive diversity and anti-discrimination training. In 2020, he was appointed the  inaugural Chair of the Justice Committee of the Black North Initiative.

Social Entrepreneur and Community Leader 
Persaud is the founder, director, advisor and volunteer with numerous not for profit organisations assisting the most vulnerable members of society as well as a committed advocate for fairness and equality. Over the course of his extensive work in the community, he has personally assisted thousands of refugees and other vulnerable and disadvantaged persons. He is also the Founder and former President of the Canadian International Peace Project (CIPP), an organisation that promotes inter-community goodwill through building relationships between diverse national, ethnic, religious, and community organisations. Among the projects that he led are a multi-faith international Afghan Project and the Canadian Jewish-Somali Mentorship Project. He is the Chair of the Justice Committee of the Black North Initiative (BNI) and a Director on the Editorial Board of Canadian Lawyer magazine.

References

External links 
www.markpersaud.com

Canadian lawyers
Harvard University alumni
York University alumni
Osgoode Hall Law School alumni